Yerba Loza may refer to the following fern species:
Gleichenia cryptocarpa
Gleichenia quadripartita
Gleichenia squamulosa